A Letter to Three Wives is a 1949 American romantic comedy-drama which tells the story of a woman who mails a letter to three women, telling them she has left town with the husband of one of them, but not saying which one. It stars Jeanne Crain, Linda Darnell, Ann Sothern, Paul Douglas (in his film debut), Kirk Douglas, and Jeffrey Lynn. Thelma Ritter as "Sadie" and Celeste Holm (the voice of "Addie Ross", the unseen woman who wrote the letter) are both uncredited.

The film was adapted by Vera Caspary and written for the screen by Joseph L. Mankiewicz from  A Letter to Five Wives, a story by John Klempner that appeared in Cosmopolitan, based on a 1945 novel by Klempner.  It was directed by Mankiewicz, who directed All About Eve the following year.

The film won the Academy Award for Best Director and the Academy Award for Best Adapted Screenplay and was nominated for Best Picture.

Plot
Just as they are about to take a group of underprivileged children on a riverboat ride and picnic, Deborah Bishop, Rita Phipps, and Lora Mae Hollingsway receive a message from Addie Ross informing them that she has run off with one of their husbands. However, she leaves them in suspense as to which one. All three marriages are shown in flashback to be strained.

Deborah grew up on a farm. Her first experience with the outside world came when she joined the Navy WAVES during World War II, where she met her future husband, upper-class Brad. When they return to civilian life, Deborah is ill at ease in Brad's social circle. Adding to her insecurity, she learns that everyone expected Brad to marry Addie, whom all three husbands consider practically a goddess.

However, she is comforted by Brad's friend Rita, a career woman who writes stories for sappy radio soap operas. Her husband George, a schoolteacher, feels somewhat emasculated since she earns much more money, but refuses to leave his teaching job, which he thinks is important despite the low pay. He is also disappointed that his wife constantly gives in to the demands of her boss, Mrs. Manleigh. Rita's flashback recalls a dinner party she gave for Mrs. Manleigh. She forgot that her husband's birthday was that night, and only remembered when a birthday present, a rare Brahms recording, arrived from Addie Ross.

Lora Mae grew up poor, not just on the "wrong side of the tracks," but literally next to the railroad tracks where passing trains shake the family home periodically. She sets her sights on her older, divorced employer, Porter, the wealthy owner of a statewide chain of department stores. Her mother, Ruby Finney, is unsure what to think of her daughter's ambition, but Ruby's friend (and the Phippses' servant) Sadie approves. Matters come to a head when Lora Mae sees a picture of Addie on the piano in Porter's home. She tells him she wants her picture on a piano: her own piano in her own home. When Porter refuses to marry her, Lora Mae breaks off their romance. However, he loves her too much, and finally gives in and proposes (albeit unromantically), skipping a New Year's party at Addie's house to do so.

When the women return from the picnic, Rita is overjoyed to find her husband at home. They work out their issues and she vows not to let herself be pushed around by Mrs. Manleigh.

Porter is late coming home, causing Lora Mae to think he has gone off with Addie, though Ruby insists that Porter loves her and would never leave. When Porter suddenly arrives and hears about his wife's suspicions, he accuses her of being happy at the thought of having grounds to divorce him and receive a large monetary settlement.

Deborah's houseman gives her a message stating that Brad will not be coming home that night. A heartbroken Deborah goes alone to the local club with the other two couples.

When Porter complains about his wife dancing with another man, Deborah tells him he has no idea how much Lora Mae really loves him, but Porter is certain Lora Mae only sees him as a "cash register." Unable to take it anymore, Deborah gets up to leave, announcing that Brad has run off with Addie. Porter stops her, confessing it was he who started to run away with Addie, but then explains that he changed his mind. As Deborah leaves to find Brad and reconcile with him, Porter then tells Lora Mae that, with his admission in front of witnesses, she can divorce him and get what she wants. To his shock, Lora Mae claims she did not hear a word he said. Finally convinced of her love, Porter asks her to dance.

The voice of Addie Ross bids all a good night. In the film, Addie Ross is never on screen; she's only present as voice-over.

Cast

 Barbara Lawrence as Georgiana "Babe" Finney, Lora Mae's sister
 Connie Gilchrist as Mrs. Ruby Finney
 Florence Bates as Mrs. Manleigh
 Hobart Cavanaugh as Mr. Manleigh
 Thelma Ritter as Sadie Dubin (uncredited)
 Celeste Holm as Addie Ross (uncredited voice)

Production
Film rights to John Klempner's A Letter to Five Wives were acquired by 20th Century-Fox in February 1946, seven months after it was first published in a magazine. Melville Baker and Dorothy Bennett wrote the first treatments of the script. Even though he was not credited for the final film, it was Baker who had the idea that the character Addie was only to be heard, and not seen. In October 1946, F. Hugh Herbert was assigned to write the screen adaptation. His final participation was not confirmed. In the same month, it was announced that Samuel G. Engel took over as producer from Joseph L. Mankiewicz. Even before a script was finished, Gene Tierney, Linda Darnell, Maureen O'Hara, Dorothy McGuire, and Alice Faye were cast in A Letter to Five Wives in November 1946.

For a while, the project was shelved until Mankiewicz returned, working on drafts of the script between March and late April 1948. Around this time, Sol C. Siegel was assigned to replace Engel as the film's producer. Vera Caspary adapted the story to A Letter to Four Wives. Then studio head Darryl F. Zanuck and Mankiewicz eventually decided in mid-1948 to focus on only three marriages, thus retitling it to A Letter to Three Wives. In June 1948, it was on the top of 20th Century-Fox' list of films to be produced over the following ten months. In addition to the actresses already named as cast members, Anne Baxter and Tyrone Power were also at one point cast. Joan Crawford and Ida Lupino were initially considered for the (eventually offscreen) role of Addie, which ultimately went to Celeste Holm.

When Baxter was cast, in April 1948, the film was still known under its working title A Letter to Four Wives. She was cast a day after Jeanne Crain, who signed on for the role after months of rumors of her participation. By May 1948, Baxter, Crain, Darnell, and Sothern were the four actresses to portray the title roles, and Macdonald Carey campaigned for a secondary role.

Differences between novel and film
Klempner's novel was A Letter to Five Wives. Two wives were lost in the transition to the screen. At one point, the film was called A Letter to Four Wives. When submitting the adapted screenplay to 20th Century-Fox chief Darryl F. Zanuck, Joseph L. Mankiewicz mentioned that he found it too long and asked how Zanuck felt about shortening the movie. "Take out one of the wives", Zanuck replied. Originally, the movie would have featured Anne Baxter as Martha. Zanuck did not feel Baxter's segment was as strong as the other three, so it was cut.

All the major characters differ substantially between the novel and film, and the nature of the problems with their marriages also. In the novel, Lora May (not Lora Mae) is less a gold digger than a woman who has always been dominated by her wealthy husband; Rita is trying to succeed in a second marriage with a man she has never felt passionate about; and Deborah is a plain and quiet former spinster whose "catch" of a husband has been disappointed in her lack of success in society. As for the other two wives, Martha and her husband locked horns over child-rearing issues, while Geraldine was devoting excessive time and money to her singing career with few results.

The novel also gives no indication that any of the couples will work through their problems (the film, ambiguities notwithstanding, has a decidedly happy ending as per the prevailing social mores and film censorship code), and the identity of the errant husband is different although not his rationale.

Reception
Variety magazine praised the film, especially the "unique story" and "a nifty screenplay". Dennis Schwartz gave the movie a B+, describing it as "a sophisticated and witty slice of life drama, that has clever framing devices and is most entertaining." John J. O'Connor, longtime critic for The New York Times, considered it a "minor classic" and "a witty vehicle for looking at the institution of marriage in postwar America." Michał Oleszczyk called it "a terrific triplicate of a melodrama."

It was nominated for the American Film Institute list AFI's 100 Years...100 Movies.

Adaptations
In 1985, the film was remade into a television movie of the same name starring Loni Anderson as Lora Mae, Michele Lee as Rita, Stephanie Zimbalist as Debra, Charles Frank as Brad, Michael Gross as George, and Ben Gazzara as Porter. Ann Sothern appeared as "Ma Finney". It was not well-received.

In popular culture
In 2010, The Simpsons made its own version of the story in an episode titled "Moe Letter Blues".

References

External links

 
 
 
 
 
 A Letter to Three Wives on Lux Radio Theater: February 20, 1950

1949 films
1949 romantic comedy films
20th Century Fox films
American black-and-white films
American romantic drama films
1940s English-language films
Films scored by Alfred Newman
Films based on American novels
Films directed by Joseph L. Mankiewicz
Films shot in New York (state)
Films whose director won the Best Directing Academy Award
Films whose writer won the Best Adapted Screenplay Academy Award
Films with screenplays by Joseph L. Mankiewicz
Films produced by Sol C. Siegel
1940s American films